The 1991 Volvo Tennis Indoor was a men's tennis tournament played on indoor hard courts that was part of the Championship Series of the 1991 ATP Tour. It was the 21st edition of the tournament and tt took place in Memphis, Tennessee, United States, from February 18 through February 24, 1991. First-seeded Ivan Lendl, who entered on a wildcard, won the singles title and earned $99,000 first-prize money.

Finals

Singles

 Ivan Lendl defeated  Michael Stich, 7–5, 6–3
 It was Lendl's 2nd singles title of the year and the 90th of his career.

Doubles

 Udo Riglewski /  Michael Stich defeated  John Fitzgerald /  Laurie Warder, 7–5, 6–3

References

External links
 ITF tournament edition details

Volvo U.S. National Indoor
U.S. National Indoor Championships
Volvo Tennis Indoor
Volvo Tennis Indoor
Volvo Tennis Indoor